The 95th Illinois General Assembly, consisting of the Illinois Senate and the Illinois House of Representatives, existed from January 10, 2007 to January 13, 2009 during the final two years of Rod Blagojevich's governorship. The General Assembly met  at Illinois State Capitol.

During the 95th General Assembly, the Illinois Senate was in session for 183 legislative days, and the Illinois House was in session for 302 legislative days. The governor called the General Assembly into special session 26 times, the most in Illinois history.

All 118 members of the House, and 38 of the 59 members of the Senate, were elected in the 2006 election. The apportionment of seats was based on the 2000 census. Both chambers had a Democratic majority. 

The 95th General Assembly was succeeded by the 96th General Assembly in January 2009.

Legislation 

The 95th General Assembly enacted a total of 1,056 bills into law. 

The General Assembly passed the Biometric Information Privacy Act (BIPA) unanimously in 2008. BIPA imposes strict requirements on companies that do business in Illinois and also collect or store biometric information. When it was enacted, BIPA was the first law in the United States regulating the use of biometric information. BIPA provides a private right of action for people who have been harmed by violations of the law. Governor Blagojevich signed BIPA into law on October 3, 2008.

The General Assembly also passed the Hospital Uninsured Patient Discount Act, which requires hospitals in Illinois to give most uninsured patients a discount on their medical bills. The Act also requires hospitals to include information on their bills about how to apply for the discount.

The General Assembly also passed the Smoke Free Illinois Act, a comprehensive anti-smoking law. The Act bans smoking inside most buildings and vehicles used by the general public, used as a place of employment, or owned by the government or other public body. It also requires "no-smoking" signs, bans smoking within  of openings in the targeted buildings and requires at least 75% of rooms in each hotel to be non-smoking. The governor signed the Act into law on July 23, 2007. The Act's passage was the product of a year-long campaign by the Illinois Coalition Against Tobacco. Illinois was the 19th state to adopt a smoking ban of this type.

Impeachment 

Near the end of the 95th General Assembly, on December 9, 2008, Governor Rod Blagojevich was arrested by federal agents and charged with conspiracy and soliciting bribes. On December 15, six days after the scandal broke with no resignation by the Governor, the Illinois House voted unanimously 113–0 to begin impeachment proceedings. This was the first impeachment inquiry against a governor in Illinois history. On the same day, House Speaker Michael Madigan formed a bipartisan committee of inquiry within the House of Representatives.

Madigan stated "We have given the governor six days to resign." He also stated that the committee would work every day except Christmas Eve, Christmas Day, New Year's Eve, and New Year's Day until they had completed their report. House Majority Leader Barbara Flynn Currie chaired the Special Committee on Impeachment.

Madigan stated that the impeachment committee would consider the pending criminal charges as well as review other possible wrongdoing during Blagojevich's term such as abuse of power, taking action without legal authority, ignoring state laws, and defying lawful requests for information from the General Assembly. Currie further stated that among the controversial actions under review by the committee would be the Blagojevich administration's purchase of a flu vaccine that was never distributed and his unilateral decision to send a $1 million grant to a private school that was damaged when the historic Pilgrim Baptist Church was destroyed by fire. She also warned that the panel's interest in investigating alleged criminal activities surrounding Blagojevich might be affected by how much cooperation was forthcoming from federal investigators, which was supported by a formal written request to Prosecutor Fitzgerald. On December 30, Fitzgerald filed a motion to allow the impeachment committee to hear the conversations recorded by wiretap during his federal investigation.

On January 8, 2009, the 21-member bipartisan committee on impeachment voted unanimously to recommend that the House impeach the Governor. The following day, the full House voted 114–1 to impeach the governor. The lone dissenter was Chicago-area Representative Milton Patterson; three other representatives abstained. After the Illinois House impeached Blagojevich, the Illinois Senate held a trial at which Illinois Supreme Court Chief Justice Thomas R. Fitzgerald presided. Under the Illinois Constitution, the Chief Justice presides over the impeachment trial of a governor.

The article of impeachment alleged a pattern of conduct constituting abuse of power, including the events described in the criminal complaint and several instances of ignoring Illinois law in his use of executive power. In particular, it accused Blagojevich of engaging in a conduct constituting a pattern of abuse of power.

The impeachment proceedings continued in the 96th General Assembly. The Illinois Senate voted unanimously to remove Blagojevich from office on January 29, 2009.

Senate 

Under the 1970 Illinois Constitution, the Illinois Senate has 59 members, who serve overlapping two- and four-year terms. Thirty votes are required for a majority, and 36 votes (or 60%) are required to override a veto or approve a constitutional amendment.

Of the 38 members elected in the 2006 Illinois Senate election, 19 were elected to four-year terms, and 19 were elected to two-year terms.

Senate leadership

Party composition 

The Senate of the 95th General Assembly consisted of 37 Democrats and 22 Republicans.

State Senators

House 

The Illinois House has 118 members, who all serve two-year terms. Sixty votes are required for a majority, and 71 votes are required to override a veto or approve a constitutional amendment.

The members of the 95th House were elected in the 2006 election.

House leadership

Party composition 

The 95th House consisted of 67 Democrats and 51 Republicans.

State Representatives

See also
 110th United States Congress
 List of Illinois state legislatures

References

External links 
Official site

2007 in Illinois
2008 in Illinois
Illinois legislative sessions
2007 U.S. legislative sessions
2008 U.S. legislative sessions